Hiroyasu (written: 宏保, 浩靖, 浩康, 博恭, 博康, 寛裕 or 仁康) is a masculine Japanese given name. Notable people with the name include:

, Japanese ski jumper
, Japanese prince and admiral
, Japanese footballer
, Japanese footballer
, member of Tatenokai
, Japanese mime
, Japanese speed skater
Hiroyasu Tamakawa (born 1995), Japanese handball player
, Japanese baseball player
, Japanese sprinter

Japanese masculine given names